The Maine Black Bears represented the University of Maine in Women's Hockey East Association during the 2020–21 NCAA Division I women's ice hockey season.

Offseason

Recruiting

Regular season

Standings

Schedule

Source:
|-
!colspan=12 style=""| Regular Season
|-

|-
!colspan=12 style=""| Hockey East Tournament
|-

2020-21 Black Bears

Awards and honors
Loryn Porter, Finalist, NCAA Women's Hockey Goalie of the Year
Taylor Leach, Team Maine (representing the top sophomore, junior, or senior student-athlete achieving the highest grade point average for the calendar year 2020)

References

Maine Black Bears
Maine Black Bears women's ice hockey seasons
Maine Black Bears